1980 presidential election may refer to:

 1980 Austrian presidential election
 1980 Cameroonian presidential election
 1980 Honduran presidential election
 1980 Icelandic presidential election
 1980 Iranian presidential election
 1980 Ivorian presidential election
 1980 Portuguese presidential election
 1980 South Korean presidential election
 1980 United States presidential election